The canton of Beaumont-de-Lomagne is a French administrative division in the department of Tarn-et-Garonne and region Occitanie.

Communes 
At the French canton reorganisation which came into effect in March 2015, the canton was expanded from 18 to 32 communes:

 Angeville
 Auterive
 Beaumont-de-Lomagne
 Belbèze-en-Lomagne
 Bourret
 Castelferrus
 Le Causé
 Comberouger
 Cordes-Tolosannes
 Coutures
 Cumont
 Escatalens
 Escazeaux
 Esparsac
 Fajolles
 Faudoas
 Garganvillar
 Gariès
 Gimat
 Glatens
 Goas
 Labourgade
 Lafitte
 Lamothe-Cumont
 Larrazet
 Marignac
 Maubec
 Montaïn
 Saint-Arroumex
 Saint-Porquier
 Sérignac
 Vigueron

References

Beaumont-de-Lomagne